This is a list of awards and nominations received by Everybody Loves Raymond.

American Film Institute

2002
 Comedy Series of the Year (nominated)
 Actor of the Year - Male - TV Series – Ray Romano (nominated)
 Actor of the Year - Female - TV Series – Doris Roberts (nominated)

2003
 TV Program of the Year (Top 10)  "This modern classic consistently makes big comedy out of small things, and its laughs are often enriched with insights into family togetherness that many dramas struggle to characterize."

2004
 TV Program of the Year (Top 10)  "Everybody Loves Raymond continues to tilt America's laugh meter as it enters its eighth season. The show's writers never fail to find timeless comedy in the simplest details of everyday life. Each member of this peerless comic cast makes the effort appear effortless, and together, they have become part of the nation's extended family."

Emmy Awards

1999 (Season 3)
Primetime Emmy Awards
 Outstanding Comedy Series (nominated)
 Outstanding Lead Actor in a Comedy Series – Ray Romano (nominated)
 Outstanding Lead Actress in a Comedy Series – Patricia Heaton (nominated)
 Outstanding Supporting Actor in a Comedy Series – Peter Boyle (nominated)
 Outstanding Supporting Actress in a Comedy Series – Doris Roberts (nominated)
 Outstanding Directing for a Comedy Series – Will Mackenzie for "Robert's Date" (nominated)

2000
Primetime Emmy Awards
 Outstanding Comedy Series (nominated)
 Outstanding Lead Actress in a Comedy Series – Patricia Heaton (won)
 Outstanding Lead Actor in a Comedy Series – Ray Romano (nominated)
 Outstanding Supporting Actor in a Comedy Series – Peter Boyle (nominated)
 Outstanding Supporting Actor in a Comedy Series – Brad Garrett (nominated)
 Outstanding Supporting Actress in a Comedy Series – Doris Roberts (nominated)
 Outstanding Directing for a Comedy Series – Will Mackenzie for "The Christmas Picture" (nominated)
 Outstanding Writing for a Comedy Series – Ray Romano and Philip Rosenthal for "Bad Moon Rising" (nominated)

Creative Arts Emmy Awards
 Outstanding Cinematography for a Multi-Camera Series – Episode: "Robert's Rodeo" (nominated)

2001
Primetime Emmy Awards
 Outstanding Comedy Series (nominated)
 Outstanding Lead Actress in a Comedy Series – Patricia Heaton (won)
 Outstanding Lead Actor in a Comedy Series – Ray Romano (nominated)
 Outstanding Supporting Actress in a Comedy Series – Doris Roberts (won)
 Outstanding Supporting Actor in a Comedy Series – Peter Boyle (nominated)

Creative Arts Emmy Awards
 Outstanding Multi-Camera Picture Editing for a Series – Episode: "Italy" (nominated)
 Outstanding Cinematography for a Multi-Camera Series – Episode: "Italy" (nominated)
 Outstanding Multi-Camera Sound Mixing for a Series or Special – Episode: "Italy" (won)

2002
Primetime Emmy Awards
 Outstanding Comedy Series (nominated)
 Outstanding Lead Actor in a Comedy Series – Ray Romano (won)
 Outstanding Supporting Actor in a Comedy Series – Brad Garrett (won)
 Outstanding Supporting Actress in a Comedy Series – Doris Roberts (won)
 Outstanding Supporting Actor in a Comedy Series – Peter Boyle (nominated)
 Outstanding Lead Actress in a Comedy Series – Patricia Heaton (nominated)
 Outstanding Writing for a Comedy Series – Philip Rosenthal for "The Angry Family" (nominated)
 Outstanding Writing for a Comedy Series – Jennifer Crittenden for "Marie's Sculpture" (nominated)

Creative Arts Emmy Awards
 Outstanding Guest Actress in a Comedy Series – Katherine Helmond (nominated)
 Outstanding Multi-Camera Picture Editing for a Series – Episode: "Talk to Your Daughter" (nominated)
 Outstanding Multi-Camera Sound Mixing for a Series or Special – Episode: "It's Supposed to Be Fun" (nominated)

2003
Primetime Emmy Awards
 Outstanding Comedy Series (won)
 Outstanding Supporting Actor in a Comedy Series – Brad Garrett (won)
 Outstanding Lead Actor in a Comedy Series – Ray Romano (nominated)
 Outstanding Supporting Actress in a Comedy Series – Doris Roberts (won)
 Outstanding Supporting Actor in a Comedy Series – Peter Boyle (nominated)
 Outstanding Lead Actress in a Comedy Series – Patricia Heaton (nominated)
 Outstanding Writing for a Comedy Series – Tucker Cawley for "Baggage" (won)
 Outstanding Writing for a Comedy Series – Mike Royce for "Counseling" (nominated)

Creative Arts Emmy Awards
 Outstanding Guest Actor in a Comedy Series – Fred Willard (nominated)
 Outstanding Guest Actress in a Comedy Series – Georgia Engel (nominated)
 Outstanding Multi-Camera Picture Editing for a Series – Episode: "She's the One" (nominated)
 Outstanding Cinematography for a Multi-Camera Series – Episode: "Just a Formality" (nominated)
 Outstanding Multi-Camera Sound Mixing for a Series or Special – Episode: "She's the One" (won)

2004
Primetime Emmy Awards
 Outstanding Comedy Series (nominated)
 Outstanding Lead Actress in a Comedy Series – Patricia Heaton (nominated)
 Outstanding Supporting Actor in a Comedy Series – Peter Boyle (nominated)
 Outstanding Supporting Actor in a Comedy Series – Brad Garrett (nominated)
 Outstanding Supporting Actress in a Comedy Series – Doris Roberts (nominated)

Creative Arts Emmy Awards
 Outstanding Guest Actor in a Comedy Series – Fred Willard (nominated)
 Outstanding Guest Actress in a Comedy Series – Georgia Engel (nominated)
 Outstanding Multi-Camera Picture Editing for a Series – Episode: "Golf for It" (nominated)
 Outstanding Multi-Camera Sound Mixing for a Series or Special – Episode: "The Model" (nominated)

2005
Primetime Emmy Awards
 Outstanding Comedy Series (won)
 Outstanding Supporting Actor in a Comedy Series – Brad Garrett (won)
 Outstanding Lead Actor in a Comedy Series – Ray Romano (nominated)
 Outstanding Supporting Actress in a Comedy Series – Doris Roberts (won)
 Outstanding Supporting Actor in a Comedy Series – Peter Boyle (nominated)
 Outstanding Lead Actress in a Comedy Series – Patricia Heaton (nominated)
 Outstanding Directing for a Comedy Series – Gary Halvorson for "The Finale" (nominated)
 Outstanding Writing for a Comedy Series – Philip Rosenthal, Ray Romano, Tucker Cawley, Lew Schneider, Steve Skrovan, Jeremy Stevens, Mike Royce, Aaron Shure, Tom Caltabiano, and Leslie Caveny for "The Finale" (nominated)

Creative Arts Emmy Awards
 Outstanding Guest Actor in a Comedy Series – Fred Willard (nominated)
 Outstanding Guest Actress in a Comedy Series – Georgia Engel (nominated)
 Outstanding Multi-Camera Picture Editing for a Series – Episode: "The Faux Pas" (nominated)
 Outstanding Cinematography for a Multi-Camera Series – Episode: "Pat's Secret" (nominated)
 Outstanding Multi-Camera Sound Mixing for a Series or Special – Episode: "Boys' Therapy" (nominated)

Golden Globe Awards

2000
 Best Actor in a Television Series (Musical or Comedy) – Ray Romano (nominated)

2001
 Best Actor in a Television Series (Musical or Comedy) – Ray Romano (nominated)

Producers Guild of America Awards

2003
 Best Television Producer of the Year Award – Episodic Comedy (nominated)

2004
 Best Television Producer of the Year Award – Episodic Comedy (nominated)

Satellite Awards

2002
 Best Television Series – Musical or Comedy (nominated)
 Best Actor in a Television Series (Musical or Comedy) – Ray Romano (nominated)

2003
 Best Supporting Actress in a Television Series (Musical or Comedy Series) – Doris Roberts (won)

Screen Actors Guild Awards

1999
 Outstanding Performance by an Ensemble in a Comedy Series (nominated)

2000
 Outstanding Performance by an Ensemble in a Comedy Series (nominated)
 Outstanding Performance by a Male Actor in a Comedy Series – Ray Romano (nominated)

2002
 Outstanding Performance by an Ensemble in a Comedy Series (nominated)
 Outstanding Performance by a Male Actor in a Comedy Series – Peter Boyle (nominated)
 Outstanding Performance by a Male Actor in a Comedy Series – Ray Romano (nominated)
 Outstanding Performance by a Female Actor in a Comedy Series – Patricia Heaton (nominated)

2003
 Outstanding Performance by an Ensemble in a Comedy Series (won)
 Outstanding Performance by a Male Actor in a Comedy Series – Ray Romano (nominated)
 Outstanding Performance by a Female Actor in a Comedy Series – Patricia Heaton (nominated)

2004
 Outstanding Performance by an Ensemble in a Comedy Series (nominated)
 Outstanding Performance by a Male Actor in a Comedy Series – Peter Boyle (nominated)
 Outstanding Performance by a Male Actor in a Comedy Series – Brad Garrett (nominated)
 Outstanding Performance by a Male Actor in a Comedy Series – Ray Romano (nominated)
 Outstanding Performance by a Female Actor in a Comedy Series – Doris Roberts (nominated)
 Outstanding Performance by a Female Actor in a Comedy Series – Patricia Heaton (nominated)

2005
 Outstanding Performance by an Ensemble in a Comedy Series (nominated)
 Outstanding Performance by a Male Actor in a Comedy Series – Ray Romano (nominated)
 Outstanding Performance by a Female Actor in a Comedy Series – Doris Roberts (nominated)
 Outstanding Performance by a Female Actor in a Comedy Series – Patricia Heaton (nominated)

2006
 Outstanding Performance by an Ensemble in a Comedy Series (nominated)
 Outstanding Performance by a Female Actor in a Comedy Series – Patricia Heaton (nominated)

External links
 Awards for Everybody Loves Raymond at IMDb

Everybody Loves Raymond